Sergei Maksimovich Pinyayev (born 2 November 2004) is a Russian football player who plays for Lokomotiv Moscow. He mostly plays as a left winger, but is occasionally deployed as a right winger as well.

Club career
He made his debut in the Russian Football National League for FC Chertanovo Moscow on 1 August 2020 in a game against FC Spartak-2 Moscow, substituting Dmitri Molchanov in the 63rd minute. Pinyaev is the youngest player ever to score in the FNL. He scored in the game against FC Irtysh Omsk at the age of 15 years, 9 months and 10 days.

Pinyaev is a player who underwent a trial with Manchester United’s academy back in 2019, when he was just 15. But even before Brexit restrictions came in, as he was a non-EU player, United could not sign him.

He made his Russian Premier League debut for PFC Krylia Sovetov Samara on 30 July 2021 in a game against FC Spartak Moscow. He scored his first goal on 22 September 2021, in the 10–0 Russian Cup elite group round win against Znamya Truda. He scored his first RPL goal on 11 December 2021 against FC Rubin Kazan at the age of 17 years and 39 days, becoming the third youngest goal scorer in RPL history, behind Jano Ananidze and Aleksandr Salugin.

On 20 July 2022, Pinyaev collapsed during a training session and was rushed to hospital, where he was diagnosed with a spontaneous pneumothorax. Reports indicated that he might need a surgery and up to 6 months to recover. He returned to play on 4 September 2022.

On 28 December 2022, Pinyaev signed a four-year contract with Lokomotiv Moscow.

International career
The youngest Russian junior national team player of all time. He made his U16 debut at the age of 13 years and 9 months.

Pinyayev was called up to the Russia national football team for the first time in November 2022 for friendly games against Tajikistan and Uzbekistan. He made his debut against Tajikistan on 17 November 2022 and became the youngest even national team player at the age of 18 years and 15 days, beating the mark held by Igor Akinfeev.

Career statistics

Club

International

References

External links
 
 
 
 Profile by Russian Football National League
 

2004 births
Sportspeople from Saratov
Living people
Russian footballers
Russia youth international footballers
Russia international footballers
Association football forwards
FC Chertanovo Moscow players
PFC Krylia Sovetov Samara players
FC Lokomotiv Moscow players
Russian Premier League players
Russian First League players